Clicks Retail Group is a group of healthcare, beauty, music and lifestyle products retail chains and brands based in South Africa, including Clicks pharmacies. The company was founded in Cape Town by Jack Goldin in 1968 and now operates over 670 retail outlets in southern Africa. In 2003, its stock was listed on the JSE Securities Exchange South Africa.

Criticism

TRESemmé Advertisement
In September 2020, Clicks faced criticism after a TRESemmé advertisement posted on its website, showing dry and damaged black hair and fine white hair, was described as racist.

Clicks stores were targeted and a number damaged by Economic Freedom Fighters protesters, while Minister of Small Business Development Khumbudzo Ntshavheni called for all TRESemmé products to be removed from its shelves.

Clicks issued an apology, temporarily closed a number of its stores, suspended staff responsible for approving the advert, pulled all TRESemmé products, and pledged to fill the gap with locally sourced hair care brands.

Operations

Brands 
New Clicks' brands include:

Clicks - health and pharmaceutical products
United Pharmaceutical Distributors (UPD) - pharmaceutical wholesaler serving hospitals, clinics, doctors' surgeries and retail health product stores
The Body Shop - natural beauty products and outlet franchise chain
Style Studio - retail hair care products and hair salon chain

References

External links
New Clicks Holdings' corporate website
Tribute to Jack Goldin is a compilation of stories and experiences during “The early years at Clicks”.

Companies based in Cape Town
Retail companies of South Africa